Razlog Municipality is located in Blagoevgrad Province, Bulgaria. It has 22,124 inhabitants.

The town of Razlog is the administrative centre.

Places include:

Demographics

Religion 
According to the latest Bulgarian census of 2011, the religious composition, among those who answered the optional question on religious identification, was the following:

References

External links

Municipalities in Blagoevgrad Province